Man from Montana is a 1941 American Western film directed by Ray Taylor and written by Bennett Cohen. The film stars Johnny Mack Brown, Fuzzy Knight, Billy Lenhart, Kenneth Brown, Jean Brooks and Nell O'Day. The film was released on September 5, 1941, by Universal Pictures. This movie should not be confused with the 1917 silent movie called The Man from Montana.

Plot

Cast        
Johnny Mack Brown as Bob Dawson
Fuzzy Knight as Grubby
Billy Lenhart as Butch
Kenneth Brown as Buddy
Jean Brooks as Linda Thompson 
Nell O'Day as Sally Preston
William Gould as Winchester Thompson
James Blaine as Sam Dunham
Richard Alexander as Del Kohler 
Karl Hackett as Flash Watson aka Trig
Edmund Cobb as Dakota
Frank Ellis as Decker
Kermit Maynard as Chris
Jack Shannon as Tex
Murdock MacQuarrie as Joel Preston
Charles McMurphy as Dugan

References

External links
 

1941 films
American Western (genre) films
1941 Western (genre) films
Universal Pictures films
Films directed by Ray Taylor
American black-and-white films
1940s English-language films
1940s American films